Tinola is a Filipino soup usually served as a main entrée with white rice. Traditionally, this dish is cooked with chicken or fish, wedges of papaya and/or chayote, and leaves of the siling labuyo chili pepper in broth flavored with ginger, onions and fish sauce.

Variants
Variants of the dish can substitute chicken with fish, seafood, or pork. Chayote or calabash (upo) can also be substituted for green papaya. In addition to pepper leaves, other leafy vegetables can also be used like pechay, spinach, moringa leaves, and mustard greens, among others. Additional ingredients like potatoes and tomatoes can also be added.

Cultural significance
One of the earliest mentions of the dish is in José Rizal's first novel, Noli Me Tangere, where Kapitan Tiago served it to Crisostomo Ibarra upon arriving from Europe. He was given the breast, to the dismay of the corrupt Spanish friar, Padre Damaso, who got chicken neck, which is considered to be the least favored chicken part.

Similar dishes
Tinola is very similar to binakol and ginataang manok, but differ in that the latter two use coconut water and coconut milk, respectively. A related dish to tinola is the lauya of the Ilocano people. However, lauya is made with pork or beef knuckles, not chicken.

A similar soup dish is known as sinabawang gulay (lit. "vegetable soup", also utan Bisaya), which is made from moringa leaves and various vegetables.

See also
 Binakol
 Ginataang manok
 Tiyula itum
 Sinampalukan
 Nilaga
 List of soups

References

Philippine chicken dishes
Philippine soups
Palauan cuisine
Papaya dishes